Alexander Ivanovich Dmitriev-Mamonov (Russian: Александр Иванович Дмитриев-Мамонов; 24  December 1787 in Saint Petersburg – 9 December 1836 in Moscow) was the commander of a Belarusian Hussar regiment and a battle painter.

Biography 
He was born into a noble family and was the son of Major-General Ivan Dmitriev-Mamonov (1754-1812). His mother, Mariya (1768-1794), died when he was only seven and his father remarried into the Tolstoy family. Most sources say that his father's second wife, Yelena (1772-1855), was his mother.

After 1806, he served as an actuary at the Collegium of Foreign Affairs, then moved to the State Chancellery.

In 1812, he joined the People's Militia in Moscow. He received the rank of Lieutenant and served in the battles of Ostrovno, Valutino, Borodino and Krasnoi. In 1813, he was assigned to a Hussar regiment, commanded by General Pyotr Palen, that followed Napoleon's retreating army and participated in numerous battles before reaching Paris.

In 1816, he became an adjutant to General Nikita Volkonsky and promotions followed rapidly. By 1823, he had been promoted to Colonel and left the General's service. He had several friends among the Decembrists and the courage to speak out on behalf of those who had been exiled or placed in custody. In 1827, he was given command of a Hussar regiment and, in 1830, took part in suppressing the November Uprising. The following year, he was promoted to Major-General. Over the next few years, he commanded light cavalry and Uhlan regiments, as well as the Hussars.

In addition to his military activities, he was an amateur artist and brought back numerous  sketches from the battles he had seen during the Napoleonic campaigns. In 1820, he was one of the founders of the Imperial Society for the Encouragement of the Arts, together with Ivan Gagarin and Pyotr Kikin. Seven years later, he established a drawing school. Many of his sketches and watercolors are displayed in the buildings at Tsarskoye Selo.

In 1835, he moved into the civil service and became a State Councillor at the Ministry of Internal Affairs. The awards he received during his military career include the Order of Saint Vladimir, Order of Saint Anna, the Medal "For the Capture of Paris" and the order Pour le Mérite.

His wife, Sofia, was maid of honor to Maria Feodorovna. His son, Emmanuil, was a portrait painter, art historian and noted Slavophile.

References

External links 

1787 births
1836 deaths
Military art
19th-century military personnel from the Russian Empire
Recipients of the Pour le Mérite (military class)
Russian Imperial Hussars officers
Hussars
Imperial Russian Army personnel
Recipients of the Order of St. Anna
Recipients of the Order of St. Vladimir
Artists from Saint Petersburg
Military personnel from Saint Petersburg